Wausaukee is the name of a town and a village in Marinette County, Wisconsin:

 Wausaukee (town)
 Wausaukee (village)